Jonathan Michael Graham Ashworth (born 14 October 1978) is a British politician serving as Shadow Secretary of State for Work and Pensions since 2021. A member of the Labour and Co-operative parties, he has been the Member of Parliament (MP) for Leicester South since 2011.

Prior to his election to Parliament, Ashworth worked as an adviser to Gordon Brown and head of party relations for Ed Miliband. He was first elected at a by-election in 2011, following the resignation of his predecessor Peter Soulsby.

In October 2016, Ashworth was appointed Shadow Health Secretary by party leader Jeremy Corbyn, shadowing Jeremy Hunt and later Matt Hancock alongside the Shadow Minister for Social Care Barbara Keeley. In April 2020, Ashworth was reappointed to the position by new leader Keir Starmer, gaining the additional shadow portfolio of social care in England. In 2021, Ashworth was appointed Shadow Work and Pensions Secretary and was succeeded by Wes Streeting.

Education
Ashworth was born in Salford, brought up in north Manchester and educated at Philips High School in Whitefield and Bury College before studying politics and philosophy at the University of Durham. In 2000 he served as National Secretary of Labour Students.

Political career

Labour Party officer (2001–2004) 
Ashworth began working for the Labour Party as a Political Research Officer in 2001, and was the Economics and Welfare Policy Officer from 2002 to 2004. In 2003, he was seconded to the Scottish Labour Party to work on the Scottish Parliament election campaign, where he worked closely with then-Chancellor of the Exchequer, Gordon Brown.  Following the election, Scottish Labour remained the single-largest party at Holyrood and were re-elected, but the coalition with the Scottish Lib Dems remained in place.

Special adviser (2004–2011) 
From 2004, he was appointed as Special Adviser to Chief Secretaries to the Treasury Paul Boateng, Des Browne and Stephen Timms, but in practice he worked for Chancellor of the Exchequer Gordon Brown. His main job was liaising with the Labour movement and an Evening Standard profile said "his contact book was "stuffed with constituency officers and union organisers", and there was newspaper speculation that he would be Political Secretary at 10 Downing Street in a potential future Brown government.

When Gordon Brown became Prime Minister in June 2007, Ashworth was appointed deputy Political Secretary with the role of linking the Government to the trade unions. There was speculation later that year that Ashworth might be selected to replace John Prescott as the official Labour candidate for Kingston upon Hull East, although it came to nothing. Ashworth spent most of the Crewe and Nantwich by-election campaign in the constituency.

His experience at Downing Street during the outbreak of swine flu in 2009 meant that he was one of the few people still working in a high-profile Westminster post in 2020 when the COVID-19 pandemic occurred  though, being in opposition then, he was unable to contribute as fully as he might have.

After the Labour Party were defeated at the 2010 general election, Ashworth became Political Secretary to the acting party leader Harriet Harman. He did not publicly support any candidate in the subsequent leadership election because of his role working for Harriet Harman but he was described as a "key member" of Ed Miliband's team on the day after Miliband won the Labour leadership election. When Miliband was elected as Leader of the Labour Party, he asked Ashworth to join his office as Head of Party Relations.

Parliamentary candidate (2011)
With a general election imminent, Ashworth was identified as someone who the Labour Party leadership wished to find a seat for. He was linked with a possible candidature in Mansfield should the sitting Member of Parliament (MP) Alan Meale decide to stand down, but Meale decided to seek re-election despite widespread speculation he was to retire from Parliament. Ashworth was then identified as a potential candidate for Nottingham East when the sitting MP John Heppell retired, but the selection went to former MP Chris Leslie when the Labour National Executive Committee chose to impose Leslie at the last minute.

Ashworth sought selection in Leicester South in 2011 when the sitting MP Peter Soulsby decided to resign to seek election as Mayor of Leicester. He was immediately identified as the front-runner for the selection and was backed by the major trade unions including his own Unite, GMB and UNISON.

Ashworth was also endorsed by the Co-operative Party and is also a Co-operative Party MP. He was selected on the first ballot by the local party, and held the seat with an increased majority on 5 May 2011.

Member of Parliament (2011–present) 
Ashworth served as an Opposition Whip from October 2011 to October 2013 and Shadow Minister of State for the Cabinet Office from October 2013 to September 2015.

Following the row over alleged undue influence of trade unions in the Labour Party in the Falkirk parliamentary selection in 2013, Ashworth penned a piece for The Daily Telegraph claiming that it is ordinary people – not the unions – who choose Labour MPs.

On 11 July 2013, Ashworth replaced Tom Watson as Deputy Chairman of the National Executive Committee.

Ashworth nominated Yvette Cooper to be Leader of the Labour Party following the resignation of Ed Miliband after the 2015 general election. He nominated Tom Watson as Deputy Leader.

Following his election as Labour Party leader, Jeremy Corbyn appointed Ashworth to the Shadow Cabinet role of Shadow Minister without Portfolio. In December 2015, Ashworth voted against the resolution to authorise RAF bombing of ISIL in Syria.

Ashworth was appointed Shadow Secretary of State for Health in October 2016. Following the 2017 general election, he went on record to say a Labour government would not repeal the controversial Health and Social Care Act 2012 despite Labour's manifesto commitment to do so.

In December 2019, it was reported 4,668 patient deaths during the year were linked to safety incidents at hospital, mental health and ambulance trusts. Ashworth held "years of Tory cutbacks" responsible for understaffing and for increasing pressures, which put patients at risk.

On 10 December 2019, it emerged that Ashworth had told a friend that he did not believe Labour would win the 2019 general election due to be held two days later. He said that this was largely due to the unpopularity of Jeremy Corbyn and voters outside the cities blaming Labour for not delivering Brexit. His friend, who was a Conservative activist, leaked a recording of the conversation to right-wing website Guido Fawkes. Ashworth later claimed that he was joking and just "joshing around".

Ashworth supported Lisa Nandy in the 2020 Labour Party leadership election. When Keir Starmer won the contest, he decided to keep Ashworth on as Shadow Health Secretary, extending his portfolio to include social care.

In the November 2021 Shadow Cabinet reshuffle, Ashworth became Shadow Secretary of State for Work and Pensions.

Personal life
Ashworth became engaged to Emilie Oldknow, the East Midlands Regional Director for the Labour Party, in 2008. She was the official Labour candidate for Sherwood at the 2010 general election, but was not elected. Former Prime Minister Gordon Brown and his wife Sarah attended the couple's wedding on 3 July 2010 in Derbyshire. They have a daughter, Gracie, born in May 2011 shortly after his by-election victory, and a second daughter, Annie.

He has used his role as shadow health secretary to advocate legislation to prevent alcoholism, inspired by his own experience of his father who was an alcoholic.

Notes

References

External links

|-

|-

|-

1978 births
Living people
Alumni of St Aidan's College, Durham
Labour Co-operative MPs for English constituencies
Members of the Privy Council of the United Kingdom
UK MPs 2010–2015
UK MPs 2015–2017
UK MPs 2017–2019
UK MPs 2019–present
Shadow Secretaries of State for Health
People from Salford
Politicians from Leicester
Politicians from Leicestershire